Longemaison is a commune in the Doubs département in the Bourgogne-Franche-Comté region in eastern France.

Geography
The village likes on the wooded slopes of the Mont Chaumont, which is the highest point of the commune at 1092 meters.

Population

See also
 Communes of the Doubs department

References

External links

 Longemaison on the intercommunal Web site of the department 

Communes of Doubs